Catapsilothrix is a genus of moths belonging to the family Tineidae.

Species
Catapsilothrix goetschmanni Rebel, 1911
Catapsilothrix klaptoczi Rebel, 1909

References

Tineidae
Tineidae genera